Eulithosia papago is a species of moth in the family Noctuidae (the owlet moths). It was first described by William Barnes in 1907 and it is found in North America.

The MONA or Hodges number for Eulithosia papago is 9768.

References

Further reading

External links

 

Amphipyrinae
Articles created by Qbugbot
Moths described in 1907